Grewia picta is a species of flowering plant in the family Malvaceae. It is found only in Seychelles. It is threatened by habitat loss.

References

picta
Vulnerable plants
Endemic flora of Seychelles
Taxonomy articles created by Polbot
Taxa named by Henri Ernest Baillon